Al-Ramtha Sports Club is a Jordanian professional football club based in Ar Ramtha, Jordan. Abdel-Halim Samara,  was the president of the club (from 1967 to 2018), is considered to be the oldest club president in the world.

A trophy every 30 years

Stadium
Al-Ramtha plays their home games at Prince Hashim Stadium in Ar Ramtha. It is also the home stadium of Ittihad Al-Ramtha. It has a current capacity of 5,000 spectators.

Kits
Al-Ramtha's home kit is all blue, while their away kit is all white.

Kit suppliers and shirt sponsors

Honours

Continental record
 Asian Club Championship: 2 appearances
1991: Qualifying Stage
2001: First Round

 Asian Cup Winners Cup: 2 appearances
1991–92: Semi-Final
1992–93: First Round

 AFC Cup: 1 appearance
2013: Group stage

Arab Club Champions Cup: 1 appearance
2018–19: First round

Arab Cup Winners' Cup: 1 appearance
1992: Group stage

Players

Current squad

Managerial history

External links
Official website
Al-Ramtha SC (19/20)
فريق: الرمثا
Jordan - Al Ramtha SC - Results, fixtures, squad, statistics, photos, videos and news - Soccerway
Al Ramtha Soccer Team Results, Fixtures, live scores - FootLive

References

Ramtha
Association football clubs established in 1966
1966 establishments in Jordan